WHRO-FM is a Public Radio broadcast radio station, broadcasting a classical music format. WHRO is licensed to Norfolk, Virginia, serving Hampton Roads.  WHRO-FM is owned and operated by the Hampton Roads Educational Telecommunications Association.

As early as 1983, a feasibility study indicated that Hampton Roads could support a second public radio station alongside HRETA's existing station, WHRO-FM at 89.5. However, it took until 1989 to obtain a construction permit for the second frequency, on 90.3. The new station signed on in 1990 and took all classical music programming from 89.5, as well as the WHRO-FM call letters. NPR programming remained on 89.5 under new calls, WHRV.

Radio reading service

WHRO Voice, a radio reading service for the blind, is broadcast on a subcarrier of WHRO. In addition, WHRO Voice is streamed online.

WHRO HD Radio 
As of June 2021, WHRO-HD2 broadcasts the Time Machine Radio Network, a channel dedicated to early-20th century Dixieland, swing, blues, and big band music, nostalgia, and old time radio, on its HD-2 channel. The Time Machine Radio Network is also simulcast on full power station WFOS and translator station W257BV. Previously, WHRO aired the independently produced and similarly programmed 1920's Radio Network on the channel

WHRO-HD3 hosts Liberty University's The Journey network (originating from WRVL/Lynchburg), a statewide CCM network, which feeds four analog FM translator stations across Hampton Roads and repeats full-power WVRL/Elizabeth City, North Carolina.

Repeaters

WHRO-FM operates two full-powered repeater stations to serve areas not covered by the main signal.

References

External links
 WHRO-FM Online
 

1990 establishments in Virginia
Public radio stations in the United States
Classical music radio stations in the United States
NPR member stations
Radio stations established in 1990
HRO-FM
HRO-FM
Radio reading services of the United States